Keybridge is a hamlet in the parish of Blisland, Cornwall, England. It is named after an old stone bridge across the De Lank River. The bridge is built of granite and dates from the 17th century or earlier; it is a Grade II listed building. It is in the civil parish of St Tudy

References

Hamlets in Cornwall